The 1951 NCAA Golf Championship was the 13th annual NCAA-sanctioned golf tournament to determine the individual and team national champions of men's collegiate golf in the United States.

The tournament was held at the Ohio State University Golf Club in Columbus, Ohio.

Two-time defending champions North Texas State again won the team title, the Eagles' third NCAA team national title.

Individual results

Individual champion
 Tom Nieporte, Ohio State

Tournament medalist
 Sam Kocsis, Detroit (141)

Team results

Note: Top 10 only
DC = Defending champions

References

NCAA Men's Golf Championship
Golf in Ohio
NCAA Golf Championship
NCAA Golf Championship
NCAA Golf Championship